All Saints' Church is a Church of England church in Durham Road, East Finchley, London. It is a grade II listed building with Historic England.

References

External links 

http://www.allsaints-eastfinchley.org.uk/

Finchley
Grade II listed churches in London
Grade II listed buildings in the London Borough of Barnet
Church of England church buildings in the London Borough of Barnet